Anastacio or Anastácio may refer to the following:

Anastacio (name)
Anastácio, Brazilian  municipality
Santo Anastácio, Brazilian  municipality
Santo Anastácio River, Brazilian river

See also

Los Anastacios, Panamanian subdivision
Casa-Museu Dr. Anastácio Gonçalves